The Football Association of the Czech Republic (FAČR) or colloquially the Czech Football Association is the governing body of association football in the Czech Republic based in Prague. It organizes the lower-level league competitions in the country (the professional Czech First League and Czech Second League are organized independently) and the Czech Cup.

History
First predecessor were established as Bohemian Football Union on 19 October 1901 in Austro-Hungarian constituency Kingdom of Bohemia. From 1922 to 1993, during the existence of Czechoslovakia, the association was known as the Czechoslovak Football Association (ČSAF) and controlled the Czechoslovakia national football team. After the partition of Czechoslovakia the association took the name Bohemian-Moravian Football Federation (Českomoravský fotbalový svaz; ČMFS) until June 2011.

Structure

Presidents

Competitions
Czech First League
Czech Second League
Czech Women's First League
Czech Cup
Czech Supercup

Divisions
Czech Republic national football team
Czech Republic women's national football team
Czech Republic women's national under-19 football team
Czech Republic women's national under-17 football team
National under-21 football team
National under-19 football team
National under-18 football team
National under-17 football team

See also
Slovak Football Association

External links
Official site 
 Czech Republic at FIFA site
 Czech Republic at UEFA site

Czech Republic
Football in the Czech Republic
Futsal in the Czech Republic
Sports governing bodies in the Czech Republic
Sports organizations established in 1901
1901 establishments in Europe
Football in Austria-Hungary